Wraparound, in video games, is a gameplay variation on the single-screen in which space is finite but unbounded; objects leaving one side of the screen immediately reappear on the opposite side, maintaining speed and trajectory. This is referred to as "wraparound", since the top and bottom of the screen wrap around to meet, as do the left and right sides (this is topologically equivalent to a Euclidean 2-torus). Some games wrap around in some directions but not others, such as games of the Civilization series that wrap around left to right, or east and west but the top and bottom remain edges representing the North and South Pole (topologically equivalent to a cylinder).

In some games such as Asteroids there is no boundary and objects can travel over any part of the screen edge and reappear on the other side. Others such as Pac-Man, Wizard of Wor, and some games in the Bomberman series, have a boundary surrounding most of the playing area but have few paths connecting the left side to the right, or the top to the bottom, that characters can travel on.

History

1962's Spacewar! had a wraparound playfield, as did the first commercial arcade video game, Computer Space (1971). Wraparound was common in games throughout the 1970s and early 1980s, including Space Race (1973), Combat (1977), Asteroids (1979), and Star Castle (1980). Surround (1977) for the Atari 2600 has a gameplay option called "wraparound" in the manual.

See also
 Flip-screen
 Side-scrolling video game
 Warp zone

References

External links
 Wraparound world at Giant Bomb, video games that use wraparound

Video game gameplay
Video game graphics